No More Ladies is a 1935 American romantic comedy film directed by Edward H. Griffith. The film stars Joan Crawford and Robert Montgomery, and co-stars Charlie Ruggles, Franchot Tone, and Edna May Oliver. The screenplay credited to Donald Ogden Stewart and Horace Jackson is based on a stage comedy of the same name by A.E. Thomas.

Plot summary
Marcia (Joan Crawford) is a young socialite who shares her New York home with her grandmother, Fanny Townsend (Edna May Oliver). Marcia is a firm believer that a couple must be faithful to one another, unlike her peers who do not feel so strongly. Marcia meets Jim (Franchot Tone), who agrees with her on the subject of a couple's monogamy and pursues her. Marcia, however, decides to pursue Sherry (Robert Montgomery), whom Marcia sees as a challenge and seeks to cure him of his philandering and womanizing nature.

After a night at a club where some of Sherry's past flings swirl about him, the couple discuss the institution of marriage and have clearly divergent views. Despite this, Marcia and Sherry are married, yet Sherry continues as before. Even on their honeymoon, Sherry flirts with the gorgeous Sally French (Jean Chatburn). Later, when the newly married couple returns home, Sherry goes home with a friend's date, Theresa German (Gail Patrick), and doesn't return that night. Marcia realizes her philandering husband has already ruined their marriage. Sherry admits to spending the night with Theresa and admits his infidelity in a rather abrupt and unapologetic manner.

Marcia decides to teach her husband a lesson by having a party to which she invites Sherry's former flames along with their mates. Marcia announces that she intends to be unfaithful to her husband, by having a fling with Jim, who still cares for Marcia. Marcia and Jim escape from the party during a game of charades, and she returns the next morning.  Sherry then sees how much his wife loves him and is convinced to reform his former ways. In any event, Marcia remained faithful to her beliefs and her husband and did not go through as she planned.

Cast

 Joan Crawford - Marcia
 Robert Montgomery - Sherry Warren
 Charlie Ruggles - Edgar Holden
 Franchot Tone - Jim Salston
 Edna May Oliver - Fanny Townsend
 Gail Patrick - Theresa German

 Reginald Denny - Oliver 
 Vivienne Osborne - Lady Diana Knowleton
 Joan Fontaine - Caroline (as Joan Burfield)
 Arthur Treacher - Lord Knowleton
 David S. Horsley - James McIntyre Duffy
 Jean Chatburn - Sally French

Production
Rachel Crothers created the original screen adaptation, but had her name removed from the screen credits, publicly dissatisfied with the studio's changes to her screenplay; other uncredited writers were Edith Fitzgerald and George Oppenheimer.  Griffith's illness prevented him from finishing the film, so George Cukor took over as director (but declined a screen credit).

Crawford made the film in her tenth year as an MGM contract player; the film was Joan Fontaine's big-screen debut.

Reception
According to Andre Sennwald of The New York Times, "the photoplay, despite its stage ancestry, is out of the same glamour factory as Miss Crawford's Forsaking All Others. If it is less furiously arch than that modern classic of sledgehammer whimsey, it is also somewhat less successful as entertainment. Out of the labors of the brigade of writers who tinkered with the screen play, there remain a sprinkling of nifties which make for moments of hilarity in an expanse of tedium and fake sophistication."  Time magazine called it a "pleasant, witty time-waster" depicting a "variety of white chromium modernistic interiors, a welter of cynical badinage over cocktails and cigarets, [and] the complications of rich idle adultery." Writing for The Spectator, Graham Greene described the film as "slickly 'problem'", "second rate", and "transient", although he praised the acting of Ruggles (playing Edgar Holden).

Box office
According to MGM records the film earned $1,117,000 in the US and Canada and $506,000 elsewhere resulting in a profit of $166,000.

References

External links

 
 
 
 

1935 films
American romantic comedy films
1930s English-language films
American black-and-white films
Metro-Goldwyn-Mayer films
Films directed by George Cukor
Films directed by Edward H. Griffith
1935 romantic comedy films
Films produced by Irving Thalberg
Films with screenplays by Donald Ogden Stewart
Films scored by Edward Ward (composer)
1930s American films